Noki may refer to:

 Noki, Angola, a community on the Congo River in Angola's Zaire province
 Noki, a video game character in Super Mario Sunshine
 Noki (software), a commercial utility for extracting data from Nokia phones
 iNoki, an iPhone version of the Noki software

See also
 Gnocchi